George Joy may refer to:
 George Joy (colonial administrator), British colonial administrator
 George W. Joy, Irish painter
 George Joye, also Joy, Bible translator